In Italy, a sagra (plural: sagre) is a local festival, very often involving food, and frequently a historical pageant and sporting events: when the sporting event is a historical recreation as well, such as a joust or a horse race in costume or armour, it is called a palio.

Overview
The various sagre almost always have their origins in old country fairs or similar entertainments, but many of them now aim at visitors or even foreign tourists, and some, like the Quintana of Foligno, had lapsed for many years but have been recently revived.

A sagra is often dedicated to some specific local food, and the name of the sagra includes that food; for example: Festival delle Sagre astigiane, a Sagra della Rana (frog) at Casteldilago near Arrone, a Sagra della Cipolla (onion) at Cannara, a Sagra della Melanzana ripiena (stuffed eggplant) at Savona, a Sagra della Polenta at Perticara di Novafeltria, a Sagra del Lattarino at Bracciano, a Sagra del Frico at Carpacco-Dignano and so on. Among the most common sagre are those celebrating olive oil, wine, pasta and pastry of various kinds, chestnuts, and cheese.

See also 
 Patronal festival
 Verbena (fair)

References

External links
 Comprehensive list of all local festivals in Italy 
 Editorial selection of the best festivals and events of local products in the Italian territory 

Festivals in Italy
Italian cuisine
Italian traditions